Magic Music may refer to:

 Magic Music, 1980 album by Third Ear Band
 "Magic Music" (Kaela Kimura song)
 "Magic Music" song by Williams, Welch, Palmer recorded by Donald Peers 1961, Gogi Grant 1962

See also
 40 Years in the Making: The Magic Music Movie